Deh Now-e Allah Verdi (also Romanized as Dehnow-e Āllah Verdī; also known as Dehno) is a village in Aliabad Rural District, in the Central District of Anbarabad County, Kerman Province, Iran. At the 2006 census, its population was 671, in 152 families.

References 

Populated places in Anbarabad County